La Trinité-sur-Mer is a commune in the Morbihan department in Brittany, in north-western France. Inhabitants of La Trinité-sur-Mer are called Trinitains.

It is located east of Carnac. The town is primarily a port, with a seaside quay dotted by numerous seafood restaurants. The town is also known for its watersport competitions.

Separated from the well known commune of Carnac in 1864, several of the famous neolithic standing stones in the Carnac stones fall within its boundaries, including the dolmens of Kerdeneven and Kermarquer, and the Petit-Ménec Alignments.

Landmarks

The Pont de Kerisper connects the commune to the neighbouring Saint-Philibert. The current bridge is a replacement, built in 1956, of the previous bridge which was destroyed by German bombing.

Notable residents
Jean-Marie Le Pen, far-right politician and perennial presidential candidate, was born in the commune. As of 2016, he owns a house in the town with his daughter, Marine Le Pen, via a family business, Pavillon de L'Ecuyer.
Alain Barrière, singer, born in 1935

Events
 The 2008 Sywoc (Student Yachting World Cup) took place in La Trinité-sur-Mer (25 October - 1 November 2008).

 The 2010 European Championship Soling took place in La Trinité-sur-Mer from 28- AUG till 3 SEP.

See also
Communes of the Morbihan department

References

External links

 Town website
 Tourist office
 Mayors of Morbihan Association 

 La Trinité-sur-Mer on the Institut Géographique National website

Communes of Morbihan
Populated coastal places in Brittany